Anatahan is an island in the Northern Mariana Islands in the Pacific Ocean, and has one of the most active volcanoes of the archipelago. Although formerly inhabited, the island is currently uninhabited due to the constant danger of volcanic eruptions.

History

The island was first charted by Europeans in late October 1543 by Spanish explorer Bernardo de la Torre on board of the carrack San Juan de Letrán when trying to return from Sarangani to New Spain. At the time, the island was settled by the Chamorros. In 1695, the natives were forcibly removed to Saipan and, three years later, to Guam. Under Spanish rule, coconut plantations were developed for the production of copra. In 1884, an estimated 125 tons were exported.

Following the sale of the Northern Marianas by Spain to the German Empire in 1899, Anatahan was administered as part of German New Guinea. However, by May 1901 the island was reported as uninhabited. In 1902, the island was leased to a private firm, the Pagan Society, owned by a German and a Japanese partner, to further develop the coconut plantations. Severe typhoons in September 1905 and September 1907 destroyed the plantations and bankrupted the company, although copra production continued on a smaller scale afterwards.

During World War I, Anatahan came under the control of the Empire of Japan and was subsequently administered as part of the South Seas Mandate. In June 1944, 30 survivors of at least three Japanese shipwrecks reached Anatahan. After the surrender of Japan in World War II, the Americans evacuated two Japanese and 45 natives from the island, but the Japanese castaways refused to believe that the war had ended, and fled into the interior of the island as Japanese holdouts. By 1950, the holdouts were led by Kazuko Higa, who was the only woman left on the island. Higa lived with a harem of five men, but after eleven of the holdouts died under uncertain circumstances, the remainder surrendered in June 1951.  The story of the holdouts was sensationalized as a lurid tale of sex and violent death by the mass media, and was portrayed in 1953 by Josef von Sternberg in his film The Saga of Anatahan. In 1954, one of the survivors, Michiro Maruyama, published a book, Anatahan Island of the Unfortunates, which attempted to refute the more lurid accusations. The story was revived in 1998 by Japanese author Kaoru Ohno as the novel Cage on the Sea, and in 2008 by Natsuo Kirino as the short story "Tokyo-jima", which became a film in 2010.

Following World War II, the island came under the control of the United States and was administered as part of the Trust Territory of the Pacific Islands. Since 1978, the island has been part of the Northern Islands Municipality of the Commonwealth of the Northern Mariana Islands.

Geography

Sparseness of vegetation in the most recent lava flows on Anatahan indicated that they were of Holocene age. In April 1990, the inhabitants of the western coast of the island were evacuated after earthquake swarms and active fumaroles indicated that an eruption might be imminent, but no eruption occurred at that time. A further earthquake swarm occurred in May 1992.

The most recent eruption was in 2007, and lasted until 2008.

Demographics
As of 1980 the population of Anatahan was one family. The people resided on Anatahan when school was not in session.

See also
 List of stratovolcanoes

Notes

References
 Russell E. Brainard et al.: Coral reef ecosystem monitoring report of the Mariana Archipelago: 2003–2007. (=PIFSC Special Publication, SP-12-01) NOAA Fisheries, Pacific Islands Fisheries Science Center 2012 (Kapitel Alamagan (englisch, PDF, 12,2 MB)).
 Richard B. Moore, Frank A. Trusdell: Geologic map of Alamagan Volcano, northern Mariana Islands. United States Geological Survey 1993 (Download).

External links 

 Anatahan: Blocks 1060 and 1993, Block Group 1, Census Tract 9501, Northern Islands Municipality, United States Census Bureau
 
 Pascal Horst Lehne and Christoph Gäbler: Über die Marianen. Lehne-Verlag, Wohldorf in Germany 1972. and Anatahan
 
 
 Saipan Oral Histories of the Pacific War page 78, 119-120.

Former German colonies
Islands of the Northern Mariana Islands
Active volcanoes
Volcanoes of the Northern Mariana Islands
Stratovolcanoes of the United States
Uninhabited islands of the Northern Mariana Islands
Holocene stratovolcanoes